Graciliella is a genus of cave beetle in the family Leiodidae. It was previously included in the genus Anthroherpon but DNA evidence showed that it is actually a more distantly related group of species. The paper in which Graciliella was published gained some media attention, with several stories picking up on the spider-like appearance of these beetles. Graciliella currently consists of six species, including the newly discovered Graciliella kosovaci and Graciliella ozimeci All species occur in subterranean habitats of the Dinaric Mountains, from Crvanj mountain (Bosnia and Herzegovina) in the north, to Trnovo (Montenegro) in the south, and from Žaba mountain (Croatia) in the west to Prokletije mountain (Montenegro) in the east.

Species 
 Graciliella absoloni (Guéorguiev, 1990)
 Graciliella apfelbecki (Müller, 1910)
 Graciliella apfelbecki apfelbecki (Müller, 1910)
 Graciliella apfelbecki scutulatum (Giachino & Guéorguiev, 1993)
 Graciliella apfelbecki schwienbacheri (Giachino & Vailati, 2005)
 Graciliella apfelbecki sculptifrons (Winkler, 1925)
 Graciliella kosovaci Njunjić et al., 2016
 Graciliella lahneri (Matcha, 1916)
 Graciliella metohijensis (Zariquiey, 1927)
 Graciliella ozimeci Njunjić et al., 2016

References 

Leiodidae
Staphyliniformia genera